The Campeonato Cearense Série C is the third tier of the state league of Ceará, Brazil.

List of champions

Name changes

Uniclinic is the currently Atlético Cearense.

Titles by team

Teams in bold stills active.

By city

References

External links
FCF Official Website

 
Cearense